Bukavac is a demonic mythical creature in Slavic mythology. Belief in it existed in Syrmia.

Bukavac was sometimes imagined as a six-legged monster with gnarled horns and bright blue eyes.  It lives in lakes and pools, coming out of the water during the night to make a loud noise (hence the name: buka – noise). It would jump onto people and animals and strangle them.

See also
Drekavac
Myling

References

Slavic demons
Slavic legendary creatures
Serbian folklore
Mythological aquatic creatures